City Park (Park-e Shahr), with its , is an urban park located in the central Tehran, Iran. It is the first public park in Tehran. City Park surrounded by Fayaz Bakhsh Street from the north, Hafez Street from the west, Behesht Street from the south and Khayyam Street from the east.

The Tehran Peace Museum is located at the northern gate of this park. Other notable sites of the park include a bird garden, an aquarium, and a central library.
In December 2014, Park-e Shahr Birdwatching Site was opened to elevate the public awareness toward eco-tourism and birds. You can see over 50 local and migratory birds in Park-e Shahr.

Structures and facilities

Recreational and sports facilities 
Recreational and sports facilities in City Park:

 Amphitheatre
 Exercise machines
 Fountains
 Playgrounds
 Restaurants and snack bars
 Sports venue
 Swimming pool

Central Library 
The park has an old and famous library that called Central library. This library was opened in 1961. In 2019, Tehran municipality purchased new equipment for the library.

Aquarium 
There is also a public aquarium in the park with fish such as lung fish, arowana, aba aba, stingray, koi and cafe.

Birds Garden 
There is also a bird garden in the park with birds such as Budgerigar, Duck, Partridge, Peafowl, Rosy-faced lovebird and weero.

Peace Museum 
The Tehran Peace Museum is located at the northern gate of City Park. The Tehran Peace Museum is a member of the International Network of Museums for Peace and the main objective of the museum is to promote a culture of peace through raising awareness about the devastating consequences of war, with a focus on the health and environmental impacts of chemical weapons.

Transportation

Public transport 
People can easily reach the park via Tehran metro. Khomeini metro station is located near the park in Toopkhaneh Square. Also, Park-e Shahr bus station is located next to the city park.

Gallery

References

External links
Birdwatching in Park-e Shahr by Ebrhaim Barzegar

Neighbourhoods in Tehran
Parks in Tehran